Tomorrow Most Likely is a children's book written by Dave Eggers and illustrated by Lane Smith. Released by Chronicle Books in 2019, it is the story of a boy, tucked into bed, thinking of all the things he would see and do tomorrow.

2019 children's books
American picture books
Novels by Dave Eggers